Minusinsky District is an administrative and municipal district (raion), one of the forty-three in Krasnoyarsk Krai, Russia. It is located in the southwest of the krai and borders with Krasnoturansky District in the north, Kuraginsky District in the east, Karatuzsky District in the southeast, Shushensky District in the south, and with the Republic of Khakassia in the west. Its administrative center is the town of Minusinsk (which is not administratively a part of the district). As of the 2010 Census, the total population of the district was 25,872.

Geography
The district is situated on the Yenisey River in the central part of the Minusinsk Hollow.

History
The district was founded on April 4, 1924.

Administrative and municipal status
Within the framework of administrative divisions, Minusinsky District is one of the forty-three in the krai. The town of Minusinsk serves as its administrative center, despite being incorporated separately as a krai town—an administrative unit with the status equal to that of the districts. The district is divided into thirteen selsoviets.

As a municipal division, the district is incorporated as Minusinsky Municipal District and is divided into thirteen rural settlements (corresponding to the administrative district's selsoviets). The krai town of Minusinsk is incorporated separately from the district as Minusinsk Urban Okrug.

Economy

Transportation
The Abakan-Tayshet railway runs through the district. A part of the federal highway M54 passes through the district as well.

References

Notes

Sources

Districts of Krasnoyarsk Krai
States and territories established in 1924